Lycodon anamallensis , also known commonly as the Russell's wolf Snake or southern Wolf snake is a species of snake in the family Colubridae. The species is endemic to South Asia.

Geographic range
L. anamallensis is found in South India and Sri Lanka.

Behavior and habitat
Like all members of its genus, L. anamallensis is a nocturnal species that is commonly found in and around human habitations, apart from natural habitat. It is partly arboreal and feeds primarily on geckos, skinks, & other small animals. It is nonvenomous.

Reproduction
L. anamallensis is oviparous.

Taxonomy
Previously, a population of this species, under the name Lycodon osmanhilli, had been thought to be endemic to Sri Lanka, until 2018 when its nomenclature, classification, and distribution were resolved by S.R. Ganesh and G. Vogel.

Etymology
The specific name, osmanhilli, is in honour of British anatomist William Charles Osman Hill.

References

Further reading
Boulenger GA (1893). Catalogue of the Snakes in the British Museum (Natural History). Volume I. Containing the Families ... Colubridæ Aglyphæ, part. London: Trustees of the British Museum (Natural History). (Taylor and Francis, printers). xiii + 448 pp. + Plates I-XXVIII. (Lycodon anamallensis, pp. 351-352 + Plate XXIV, figure 1).
Ganesh, Sumaithangi Rajagopalan; Vogel, Gernot (2018). "Taxonomic reassessment of the Common Indian Wolf Snakes Lycodon aulicus (Linnaeus, 1758) complex (Squamata: Serpentes: Colubridae)". Bonn zoological Bulletin 67 (1): 25–36.
Günther ACLG (1864). The Reptiles of British India. London: The Ray Society. (Taylor and Francis, printers). xxvii + 452 pp. + Plates I-XXVI. (Lycodon anamallensis, new species, p. 318–319).
Taylor EH (1950). "The Snakes of Ceylon". University of Kansas Science Bulletin 33 (14): 519–603. (Lycodon osmanhilli, new species, pp. 562–565, Plate XX).
Latest study on this species:

https://doi.org/10.3897/vz.71.e64345

osmanhilli
Snakes of Asia
Reptiles of India
Reptiles of Sri Lanka
Reptiles described in 1864
Taxa named by Albert Günther
Taxobox binomials not recognized by IUCN